Asafo are traditional warrior groups in Akan culture, based on lineal descent. The traditional role of the Asafo companies was defence of the state. As the result of contact with European colonial powers on the Gold Coast (present-day Ghana), the Fante, who inhabit the coastal region, developed an especially complex version of the concept in terms of its social and political organization based on martial principles, and with elaborate traditions of visual art, including flag banners with figurative scenes, and designs alluding to historical events or proverbs.

Asafo societies on the Gold Coast

Elmina

In Elmina, Asafo companies emerged in the early 18th century out of the wards of Elmina that had existed since at least the 17th century. The omission of a description of Asafo companies in Willem Bosman's  (1703) leads Harvey Feinberg to the conclusion that these companies could not have been very important by that date. This changed in the first quarter of the 18th century, when the original three wards had been complemented by four new wards consisting of new immigrant groups to Elmina.

In 1724, when the Dutch needed the help of the Elminese to oust John Canoe from Fort Groß Friedrichsburg, they organized the wards into rank order, with each ward having a number and an established military formation. It was this occasion that gave rise to the domination of Asafo companies in the socio-political life of Elmina, and of the 10 Asafo companies existing today, seven are mentioned in 1724:

No. 1  (also )
No. 2  (also )
No. 3  (also )
No. 4  (previously)
No. 5  (also )
No. 6  (also)
No. 7 

The Asafo companies were ranked in reverse order of importance. Asafo company No. 7  is supposed to be the company of the founder of Elmina, Kwa Amankwaa. This company still elects the King of Elmina, who must either be from the Nsona or Anona royal family. Asafo company No. 3  elects the leader of all Asafo companies known as the Great Ensign. This was the case under Dutch influence. The importance of rank is illustrated by the conflict between No. 5  and No. 6  in the late 1750s over the number six position. It was only when Governor Jan Pieter Theodoor Huydecoper threatened to fire cannon from Fort Coenraadsburg into Elmina that the conflict was finally settled.

In the 19th century, three Asafo companies were added to the existing seven:

No. 8 
No. 9 
No. 10 

No. 8  consisted of refugees from Eguafo and Simbiw, who fled to Elmina during the Fante War of 1810. No. 9  consisted of the descendants of the slaves who had worked for the Dutch West India Company and who were collectively dismissed in the early 19th century. No. 10  consisted of free citizens. This company comprised mulattoes who were considered equals to the European officers, and who often worked in the lower ranks of the Dutch administration. This company elected the burgomaster of Elmina.

Cape Coast
The asafo companies feature largely in the Fetu Afahye festival of Cape Coast, held annually on the first Saturday of September.

Colours
Each asafo company has designated uniform colours that have been historically established. Esi Sutherland-Addy identifies these in Oguaa as:
 No. 1.  – red
 No. 2.  – blue and white
 No. 3.  – green
 No. 4.  – yellow
 No. 5.  – wine and black
 No. 6.  – white
 No. 7.  – white and black

Further reading
 
  PhD Thesis.

See also 
 Akan chieftaincy

References

External links
 twi.bb Online dictionary for the Twi language of the Akan people of Ghana in West Africa.
 Fetu Afahye Festival 2010 2/2 Chiefs arrive, YouTube.
 Brian L. Perkins, "Traditional Institution in Coastal Development: Asafo Companies in Cape Coast History", DigitalCollections@SIT, African Diaspora Collection.

Akan culture
History of Ghana